Mohamed Reda (born 10 November 2000), known as Bobo, is an Egyptian footballer who plays as a midfielder for Future FC.

Career 
On 3 October 2021, he moved on loan with a buy-option to newly promoted Future. Future activated the option in June 2022.

Honours
Future
EFA Cup: 2022

References

External links 
 

2000 births
Living people
Egyptian footballers
Wadi Degla SC players
Future FC (Egypt) players
Egyptian Premier League players
Association football midfielders